Paul Brousse (23 January 18441 April 1912) was a French socialist, leader of the possibilistes group. He was active in the Jura Federation, a section of the International Working Men's Association (IWMA), from the northwestern part of Switzerland and the Alsace. He helped edit the Bulletin de la Fédération Jurassienne, along with anarchist Peter Kropotkin. He was in contact with Gustave Brocher between 1877 and 1880, who became anarchist under Brousse's influence. Paul Brousse edited two newspapers, one in French and another in German. He helped James Guillaume publish its bulletin.

Paul Brousse studied medicine and travelled to Barcelona in his youth. He then joined the IWMA and participated to the Geneva Congress in September 1873, seeing anarchism as the only possible social organization. On 18 March 1877 he took part in Bern in a demonstration in remembrance of the 1871 Paris Commune, which ended in riots with the police. Paul Brousse was subsequently condemned to one month of prison. In 1877 he published (initially anonymously) the revolutionary song Le drapeau rouge (known in English as The Standard of Revolt). On 15 April 1879 he was again sentenced to two months of prison, then expelled from Switzerland for having published an article in L'Avant-Garde which legitimized the propaganda of the deed attempts of Giovanni Passannante, Juan Oliva Moncasi, Max Hödel and Karl Nobiling.

Paul Brousse returned to France in 1880 and progressively became more reformist. He began to take part in the French Workers' Party (POF) and then, after a scission, to the Federation of the Socialist Workers of France (FTSF), which became known as the "possibilists". He voted at the 1896 international congress in London along with Jules Guesde for the expulsion of the "anti-authoritarian socialists", as were known the anarchists. The possibilists then joined Jean Jaurès's French Socialist Party in 1902, which fused with others movements in 1905 to create the French Section of the Workers' International (SFIO).

Further reading
 
 David Stafford. From anarchism to reformism: a study of the political activities of Paul Brousse 1870-90, Weidenfeld & Nicolson London, 1971.

External links

1844 births
1912 deaths
Politicians from Montpellier
French anarchists
French Workers' Party politicians
Federation of the Socialist Workers of France politicians
French Socialist Party (1902) politicians
French Section of the Workers' International politicians
Members of the 9th Chamber of Deputies of the French Third Republic
Members of the International Workingmen's Association
Burials at Père Lachaise Cemetery
Jura Federation